V. Narayanasamy was sworn in as Chief Minister of Puducherry on 6 June 2016. Here is the list of ministers:

Cabinet ministers
Ministers sworn on 6 June 2016:

Notes

References

Government of Puducherry
Indian National Congress state ministries
Puducherry ministries
2016 establishments in Puducherry
Cabinets established in 2016